The International Multilateral Partnership Against Cyber Threats (IMPACT) is the first United Nations-backed cybersecurity alliance. Since 2011, IMPACT serves as a key partner of the United Nations' (UN) specialised agency for ICTs – the International Telecommunication Union (ITU).

Being the first comprehensive public-private partnership against cyber threats, IMPACT serves as a politically neutral global platform that brings together governments of the world, industry and academia to enhance the global community's capabilities in dealing with cyber threats. With a total of 152 countries now formally part of the ITU-IMPACT coalition, and with strong support from industry giants, partners from academia and international organizations, IMPACT is the largest cybersecurity alliance of its kind.

Headquartered in Cyberjaya, Malaysia, IMPACT is the operational home of ITU's Global Cybersecurity Agenda (GCA). IMPACT offers ITU's Member States with access to expertise, facilities and resources to effectively address cyber threats, as well as assisting United Nations agencies in protecting their ICT infrastructures.

The IMPACT initiative was first announced by the fifth prime minister of Malaysia during the closing ceremony of the 15th World Congress on Information Technology (WCIT) 2006, held in the Austin, Texas, United States.

Initially IMPACT was known as the 'International Multilateral Partnership Against Cyber-Terrorism'.  In 2008, following feedback from member governments and also from IMPACT's international advisory board (IAB) during IMPACT's official launch at the World Cyber Security Summit 2008 (WCSS), the words 'Cyber Terrorism' in IMPACT's name was changed to 'Cyber Threats' to reflect its wider cybersecurity role.

Facilities at the Global Headquarters

IMPACT's Global Headquarters was inaugurated on 20 May 2009.  It was built on a 28,400 square metre site (seven-acre site) with a built-up area of over 5,400 square metres (58,000 square feet).  Modelled after the Centers for Disease Control and Prevention (CDC) in Atlanta, United States, IMPACT operates a Global Response Centre (GRC). As the nerve centre of IMPACT, the GRC is fully equipped with a crisis room, IT and communications facilities, a fully functional Security Operations Centre (SOC), well-equipped data centre, on-site broadcasting centre and a VIP viewing gallery.  The GRC is involved in securing the objectives of ITU's Global Cybersecurity Agenda (GCA) by placing the technical measures to combat newly evolved cyber threats.

Inauguration of the IMPACT Global Headquarters by the prime minister of Malaysia and the secretary-general of the International Telecommunication Union

The IMPACT Global Headquarters was officially declared open on 20 May 2009 by the 5th Prime Minister of Malaysia, Tun Abdullah bin Ahmad Badawi, witnessed by the prime minister of Malaysia, Dato' Sri Mohd Najib bin Tun Abdul Razak and the secretary-general of the ITU, Hamadoun Touré and IMPACT's chairman, Datuk Mohd Noor Amin

Through the GRC, IMPACT provides the global community with network early warnings system (NEWS), expert locator, team management, remediation, automated threat analysis system, trend libraries, visualisation of global threats, country-specific threats, incident and case management, trend monitoring and analysis, knowledge base, reporting, and resolution finder among others.

Collaboration with the ITU

IMPACT formally became a key partner of ITU – the United Nations’ (UN) specialised agency, following a Cooperation Agreement signed during the World Summit for Information Society 2011 (WSIS) Forum in Geneva, May 2011.

Under the Cooperation Agreement, IMPACT is tasked by ITU with the responsibility of providing cybersecurity assistance and support to ITU's 193 Member States and also to other organisations within the UN system.  The Memorandum of Agreement was officially signed by Hamadoun Touré, the secretary-general of ITU and Datuk Mohd Noor Amin, chairman of IMPACT at the ITU's head office in Geneva.  Founded in 1865, ITU is the oldest organisation within the UN system and functions as the UN's specialised agency for information and communication technologies.

IMPACT's involvement with ITU began in 2008 when it was named as the physical home of ITU's Global Cybersecurity Agenda (GCA).  The GCA is an international cybersecurity framework that was formulated following deliberations by more than 100 leading experts worldwide.  The GCA contains many recommendations, which when adopted and implemented, are intended to provide improved global cybersecurity.  Through a Memorandum of Understanding inked in Bangkok back in 2008, IMPACT was named as the physical and operational home of the GCA.

In addition to this, during the 2011 WSIS Forum, a Memorandum of Understanding (MoU) was signed between ITU and the United Nations Office on Drugs and Crime (UNODC) which will see IMPACT supporting both organisations in their collaboration to assist UN member states to mitigate risks posed by cybercrime.

Partner countries of ITU-IMPACT are also given access to a host of specialised services including monitoring, analysis and alerts on cyber threats.

IMPACT's Global Response Centre (GRC) acts as a global cyber threat resource centre and provides emergency responses to facilitate identification of cyber threats and sharing of resources to assist ITU-UNODC Member States. IMPACT's Global Response Centre (GRC) collaborates with industry and academia, and hosts a comprehensive database on cyber threats. IMPACT's Electronically Secure Collaborative Application Platform for Experts (ESCAPE), is designed to connect those responsible for cybersecurity from over 140 countries. It also provides a response mechanism for ITU-IMPACT partner countries.

The other three divisions within IMPACT are Centre for Policy & International Cooperation, Centre for Training & Skills Development and Centre for Security Assurance & Research. These divisions provide consulting and training services, scholarships, reports and expertise to governments, industry and academia in partner countries.

International Advisory Board

 International Advisory Board (IAB) members included:

 Chairman: Blaise Compaoré, president of Burkina Faso. Prior to the appointment of the president of Burkina Faso, the prime minister of Malaysia held the position as chairman of the IAB from its establishment (in 2008) to 2011.
Hamadoun Touré, Secretary-General of the ITU
Steve Chang, Founder & Chairman of Trend Micro
Eugene Kaspersky, founder and chief executive officer of Kaspersky Lab
 Fred Piper, Cryptologist, founder of the Information Security Group at Royal Holloway, University of London
 Gilbert G. Noël Ouedraogo, Minister of Transport & Information Technology, Burkina Faso 
 Samuel Lesuron Poghisio, MP, Minister of Information and Communications, Kenya 
 M. Ali Abbasov, Minister of Communications & Information Technologies, Azerbaijan
 Vujica Lazović, Minister of Information Society and Telecommunications, Montenegro
 Salim Sultan Al Ruzaiqi, chief executive officer, Information Technology Authority (ITA), Oman
 Tim Unwin, chief executive officer, Commonwealth Telecommunications Organisation
 Tim Archdeacon, president and chief executive officer, ABI Research
 Abdou Diouf, secretary-general, International Organisation of La Francophonie (OIF)
 Angela Sinaswee-Gervais, permanent secretary, Trinidad & Tobago

Past members include Vinton G. Cerf, vice president and chief Internet evangelist, Google, Howard Schmidt, the former White House Cyber Security Coordinator of the Obama and Bush Administrations, United States of America, Mikko Hyppönen, chief research officer of F-Secure, John W. Thompson, former chairman of the board, Symantec Corporation and Ayman Hariri, chairman of Oger Systems.

Under the advisory board, the management team consists of 
Mohd Noor Amin, chairman, management board,
Mohamed Shihab, advisor (technical),
Mohamed Zaini Bin Mazlan, advisor (administration),
Anuj Singh, chief operating officer (COO),
Phillip Victor, director of policy and international cooperation,
and Mohamad Sazly Musa, director of security assurance.

Support

 The Malaysian Government provided US$13M grant with a view to establish IMPACT's central headquarters equipped with the best facilities for international community.
 F-Secure have contributed its expertise in establishing IMPACT's Global Response Centre – designed as the first line of defence against cyber threats.
 Kaspersky Lab provided technical expertise in setting up IMPACT's Network Early Warning System (NEWS) in the Global Response Centre.
 SANS Institute and EC-Council has contributed a grant of US$1m each to IMPACT to create scholarships schemes for developing nations that will help enhance and build capacity and capability in cybersecurity.
 Symantec Corporation assisted IMPACT in establishing the "IMPACT Government Security Scorecard".

See also
 International Telecommunication Union
 United Nations Information and Communication Technologies Task Force

References

External links
 
 Cybersecurity Gateway of the ITU 
 Official IMPACT's Facebook Page 
 Official IMPACT's Linkedin Page 
 Official IMPACT's Twitter Page  
 Speech by YAB Dato' Seri Ahmad Badawi, Prime Minister of Malaysia during WCIT 2008, Kuala Lumpur
 Tackling Cyberthreats, Championing Cyberpeace
 Training & Skills development
 Centre for Security Assurance & Research
 Centre for Policy & International Cooperation

Video clips
 IMPACT's Official Launch Video
 IMPACT's Official YouTube Page
 CNBC's Interview with IMPACT Chairman on African Cybersecurity
 Bloomberg's Interview with IMPACT Chairman in Singapore for their Asia Confidential Program
 BBC World's Interview on IMPACT with the Head of the UN's International Telecommunication Union
 Inauguration of IMPACT Global Headquarters

Computer security organizations
International Telecommunication Union
Internet governance organizations
Prime Minister's Department (Malaysia)
2008 establishments in Malaysia